Christian Friedel (born 9 March 1979) is a German actor and singer.

Career

Film & television 
Friedel has appeared in films and television series since 2009 including 13 Minutes, where he portrayed Georg Elser. More recently, he played police photographer Gräf in the esteemed drama series Babylon Berlin and was a main character in the German mini-series Perfume.

Stage 
After studying acting at Otto Falckenberg School of the Performing Arts in Munich, Friedel acted in the German theatre companies of Bayerisches Staatsschauspiel, Munich Kammerspiele and Schauspiel Hannover.

Since its 2009–2010 season, he has been part of the company at Staatsschauspiel Dresden, and has acted in title roles such as Schiller's Don Carlos and Shakespeare's Hamlet.

In Spring 2017, Friedel played the role of Nathanael in a stage adaption of E. T. A. Hoffmann's The Sandman by Robert Wilson at the Düsseldorfer Schauspielhaus.

Music 
In June 2011, Friedel and four members of the German band Polarkreis 18 formed the band Woods of Birnam.

Selected filmography

References

External links 

1979 births
Living people
German male film actors